National People's Movement can refer to:

 National People's Movement (Morocco)
 National People's Movement (Poland)
National People's Movement (Sri Lanka)

See also

 People's National Movement